The Protestant Church of Algeria (EPA ) is a federation of Protestant churches from the Reformed and Methodist traditions established in 1972 in Algeria. It is officially recognised by the government of Algeria as the Association of the Protestant Church of Algeria.

While exact numbers are not precise, estimates of members range from 100,000 to 150,000 in about 40 to 50 parishes nationwide, primarily in the northern coastal region of the country.

History

Protestantism has been present in Algeria since the early days of French rule in Algeria. The first synod of the Reformed churches was held in 1843 and the French Methodists began mission work in Béjaïa around 1883. By 1914, American Methodist missionaries were also well established in Algeria. After the traumatic independence of Algeria, many local Christians fled the country  and by 1970, mission run schools and properties have been nationalised.

Federation

In 1972, the French Reformed communities and the Methodist communities in Algeria federated into a single body known as the Protestant Church of Algeria. The EPA was officially recognised by the Algerian authorities in 1974 as representing the Protestant community in the country.

De-registration and church closures

In 1990, a new law, Ordinance 90-31, was passed in Algeria requiring religious organizations to update their status. The EPA attempted to do so but failed and was subsequently de-registered by the Algerian government, making it an illegal organization. In 2006, Ordinance 06-03 was passed in Algeria to regulate religious places of worship to register with the government in order to operate. This resulted in churches being closed and regular ministry to Christians being curtailed, particularly in Kabylie.

The EPA and other Christian communities in Algeria continued to receive harassment by Algerian government throughout the period with churches being closed and Christians arrested and charged for conversion, proselytization, and blasphemy The closures came in waves, including a wave that lasted from November, 2017 to October, 2019 and resulted in eighteen churches being forcibly closed.

Re-legalisation

On 18 July 2011, the EPA was granted re-registration by the Algerian government. This has opened the door for formal dialogue between the EPA and the Algerian government on the issues faced by Algerian Christians in the country, including initial discussions on reform and the possible abolition of Ordinance 06-03.

Affiliations

The EPA is affiliated with the following bodies and participates in ecumenical work:

 World Council of Churches
 World Evangelical Alliance
 Middle East Council of Churches
 Fellowship of Middle East Evangelical Churches
 All Africa Conference of Churches
 World Communion of Reformed Churches
 World Methodist Council

See also

Christianity in Algeria
Religion in Algeria

References

External links
Eglise protestante d Algerie
World Alliance of Reformed Churches
Middle East Council of Churches

Protestantism in Algeria
Members of the World Communion of Reformed Churches
Members of the World Alliance of Reformed Churches
Members of the World Council of Churches
Protestant denominations established in the 20th century
Reformed denominations in Africa
Christian organizations established in 1972
1972 establishments in Algeria